Terremoto is the fifth studio album from Italian rock band Litfiba and the band's most hard rock album. It continues on the way started with previous album El Diablo to harden the music, with the massive use of distorted guitars that contrasts with the new wave pop rock performed on the 3 first albums. Lyrics are also stronger and refer to social and political criticism. It is the second chapter of the "Tetralogy of elements", started on "El Diablo". It is dedicated to earth.
It was produced by Alberto Pirelli.

Track listing
 Dimmi il nome – 3:41
 Maudit – 4:54
 Fata Morgana – 5:13
 Soldi – 3:49
 Firenze sogna – 4:38
 Dinosauro – 3:47
 Prima guardia – 4:56
 Il mistero Di Giulia – 5:57
 Sotto il vulcano – 4:50

Personnel
Piero Pelù - Vocals
Roberto Terzani - Bass
Ghigo Renzulli - Guitars
Antonio Aiazzi - Keyboards
Franco Caforio - Drums
Fabrizio Simoncioni recording and mixing
Produced by Alberto Pirelli

References

Litfiba albums
1993 albums
Italian-language albums